Natalya Borisovna Ryazantseva (27 October 1938 – 10 January 2023) was a Russian screenwriter and academic.

Life and career 
Born in Moscow, Ryazantseva graduated from the Gerasimov Institute of Cinematography and started her career as a collaborator of Larisa Shepitko. During her career, she authored about two dozens of film screenplays. Because of her work, she was named Honored Artist of the RSFSR. In addition to his cinema works, Ryazantseva was professor of scriptwriting in her alma mater.  She died on 10 January 2023, at the age of 84. She had been married to the film director  Ilya Averbakh.

Selected filmography
 Wings   (1966)
 Private Life of Kuzyayev Valentin  (1967)
 The Long Farewell  (1971/1987)
 Other People's Letters  (1975)
 The Scarlet Flower  (1977)
 A Painter's Wife Portrait  (1981)
 The Voice  (1982)
 Brothel Lights  (2011)

References

External links 
  

1938 births
2023 deaths  
Soviet screenwriters
20th-century Russian screenwriters
Russian women screenwriters
20th-century Russian women writers 
Writers from Moscow 
Gerasimov Institute of Cinematography alumni
Academic staff of the Gerasimov Institute of Cinematography
Honored Artists of the RSFSR
Burials in Troyekurovskoye Cemetery